Tzavalas Karousos (Greek: Τζαβαλάς Καρούσος; 8 September 1904 – 3 January 1969) was a Greek actor.

Career

He was born in Lefkada and first acted in the theatre participating in the Veakis-Nezer (Nesser) theatrical company.  With theatrical studies in France and other European countries, he played at the National Theatre during the golden period of Fotos Politis. After the war he took part at the theatrical company and with the Greek Folklore Theatre with Manos Katrakis.

He first acted in the National Theatre and succeeded Aimilios Veakis. He switched to the modern Greek work and first starred in many Greek movies (I zavoliara, Orgi, Antigone, Anthropos yia oles tis doulies, Faidra, etc.) The role which made him famous was Shylock in The Merchant of Venice by Shakespeare. He later finished his acting career due to the dictatorship. He last appeared at the Piraeus Public Theatre. He left for Paris, where he remained until his death at age 64 in 1969.

Filmography

External links
 

1904 births
1969 deaths
People from Lefkada
Greek male stage actors
20th-century Greek male actors